Celaque may refer to:
 Celaque National Park, a national park in Honduras
 Cordillera de Celaque, a mountain range and escarpment in Honduras
 Montaña Celaque or Pico de Celaque, the highest peak in the Cordillera de Celaque and the highest elevation in Honduras, also known as Cerro Las Minas
 Bolitoglossa celaque, a species of salamander endemic to Honduras